List of the National Register of Historic Places listings in Richmond County, New York.

This is intended to be a complete list of properties and districts listed on the National Register of Historic Places on Staten Island, or in other words in Richmond County, New York, United States.  The locations of National Register properties and districts (at least for all showing latitude and longitude coordinates below) may be seen in a map by clicking on "Map of all coordinates".



Current listings

|}

See also
 Statewide: National Register of Historic Places listings in New York
 Citywide: Manhattan, Queens, Brooklyn, Bronx
 List of New York City Designated Landmarks in Staten Island

References

Richmond County
Richmond